The Phi Mu Sorority House is a historic sorority house at the University of Illinois at Urbana–Champaign in Urbana, Illinois. The sorority house was built in 1928 for the university's Delta Beta chapter of the Phi Mu sorority, which formed in 1921; the sorority itself was founded in 1852 and is one of the oldest sororities in the United States. At the time, the university had one of the largest Greek letter society movements in the country. The sorority's house has a Spanish Eclectic design with an arcaded porch and large patio, a campanile on one corner, and a colored tile roof. Phi Mu used the house until moving to a new building after World War II; the building has since been used by other Greek and student life groups.

The building was added to the National Register of Historic Places on May 21, 1990.

References

Residential buildings on the National Register of Historic Places in Illinois
Houses completed in 1928
National Register of Historic Places in Champaign County, Illinois
Buildings and structures of the University of Illinois Urbana-Champaign
Fraternity and sorority houses
Buildings and structures in Urbana, Illinois
University of Illinois Urbana-Champaign
Sorority houses
History of women in Illinois